Pagyda rubricatalis is a moth in the family Crambidae. It was described by Swinhoe in 1890. It is found in Burma.

References

Moths described in 1890
Pyraustinae